Hines '74 is an album by pianist Earl Hines recorded in France in 1974 for the Black & Blue label.

Reception

Allmusic awarded the album 4 stars stating "Even though this enjoyable date is not the best starting point for a jazz fan who is just beginning to explore the recorded legacy of Earl Hines, those already familiar with his work will enjoy this".

Track listing
 "Tangerine" (Victor Schertzinger, Johnny Mercer) - 3:19  
 "There'll Be Some Changes Made" (W. Benton Overstreet, Billy Higgins) - 7:57  
 "You're Driving Me Crazy" (Walter Donaldson) - 7:06  
 "Makin' Whoopee" (Donaldson, Gus Kahn) - 8:46  
 "My Buddy" (Donaldson, Kahn) - 9:24

Personnel 
Earl Hines - piano
Jimmy Leary - bass
Panama Francis - drums

References 

1974 albums
Earl Hines albums
Black & Blue Records albums